Roberto Dorion B. served as the President and International Commissioner of the Asociación de Scouts de Guatemala, as well as the Chairman of the Interamerican Scout Committee.

In 1995, he was awarded the 239th Bronze Wolf, the only distinction of the World Organization of the Scout Movement, awarded by the World Scout Committee for exceptional services to world Scouting. He was also a recipient of the Silver World Award.

References

Recipients of the Bronze Wolf Award
Year of birth missing
Scouting and Guiding in Guatemala